is a former Japanese football player.

Playing career
Kubota was born in Kyoto Prefecture on April 12, 1973. After graduating from high school, he joined Gamba Osaka in 1992. Although he debuted in 1994, he could hardly play in the match. In 1995, he moved to his local club Kyoto Purple Sanga in Japan Football League. The club won the 2nd place in 1995 and was promoted to J1 League. However he could not play at all in the match in 1996. In 1997, he moved to Regional Leagues club Sagawa Express Osaka. Although the club was promoted to Japan Football League from 2002 season, he retired end of 2001 season.

Club statistics

References

External links

sports.geocities.jp

1973 births
Living people
Association football people from Kyoto Prefecture
Japanese footballers
J1 League players
Japan Football League (1992–1998) players
Gamba Osaka players
Kyoto Sanga FC players
Association football midfielders